Avenging Waters is a 1936 Western film directed by Spencer Gordon Bennet and starring Ken Maynard, Beth Marion, Ward Bond and John Elliott. It was written by Nate Gatzert.

Plot summary
A film about a land dispute. Charles Mortimer (Elliott) buys cattle from Ken Morley (Maynard) and builds a fence to keep them in. His neighbour, Slater (Bond), is angered by Mortimer's actions because he wants access to the land. By way of revenge, he builds a dam cutting off Mortimer's water supply. Morley confronts Slater, and Slater captures and imprisons him in a shack. The dam is subsequently destroyed by lightning, and the shack holding Morley is in the path of the oncoming wall of water. Aided by his horse and a stout rope, Morley is able to get the bars off the shack window and escape the shack, riding toward Mortimer's place just ahead of the water. Mortimer and his henchman hear the water coming and flee the ranch on horseback, riding double. But they've left behind another prisoner, the girl. Morley is just in time to scoop her up in his arms and ride up a nearby hillock to safety, as the water, having already destroyed his shack-prison, rushes over top of the Mortimer ranch. They get married, and Mortimer and his man are never heard from again.

Cast
 Ken Maynard - Ken Morley
 Beth Marion - Mary Mortimer
 Ward Bond - Marve Slater
 John Elliott - Charles Mortimer
 Zella Russell - Aunt Eloise Smythe
 Hal Taliaferro - Slivers
 The Stafford Sisters - comic singers (uncredited)

External links
 

1936 films
1930s English-language films
1936 Western (genre) films
American Western (genre) films
American black-and-white films
Columbia Pictures films
Films directed by Spencer Gordon Bennet
1930s American films